The SS Alpena (formerly the SS Leon Fraser) is a lake freighter. She was built in 1942 by the Great Lakes Engineering Works in Ecorse, Michigan, to carry iron ore. She was originally owned by the Pittsburgh Steamship Company, a subsidiary of United States Steel. After also hauling grain in addition to ore in the 1960s and 1970s, the ship was put into storage in 1982.

In 1990, the ship was purchased by New Management Enterprises and renamed the Alpena, which uses her to transport cement between Alpena, Michigan, and other Great Lakes cement ports.

By 2015, she was the oldest active steamship on the Great Lakes. In December 2015, she was damaged by a fire while in a dry dock for an inspection. As of 2021, the ship is owned by Andrie Transportation Group and Inland Lakes Management.

Ore carrier (SS Leon Fraser) 

The Leon Fraser was launched on February 28, 1942. She was built by the Great Lakes Engineering Works at their River Rouge yards in Ecorse, Michigan. She was named for Leon Fraser, president of the First National Bank of New York and a director of United States Steel.

The Leon Fraser was one of a class of five identical ships built during World War II to carry iron ore. The other four ships in this  class of "super carriers" were the Benjamin F. Fairless, A. H. Ferbert, Irving S. Olds, and Enders M. Voorhees. The first in her class to be launched, the Leon Fraser became the longest ship on the Great Lakes by freeboard length, surpassing Canada Steamship Lines' Lemoyne. However, the Lemoyne remained the longest ship as measured by keel length.

The Leon Fraser was fitted with a DeLaval Steam Turbine Company steam turbine engine and two Babcock & Wilcox water-tube boilers.

The Leon Fraser was originally owned by the Pittsburgh Steamship Company, a subsidiary of United States Steel. During this period of ownership, the ship served steel ports on the Great Lakes, including those at Chicago; Conneaut, Ohio; Gary, Indiana; and Lorain, Ohio.

In May 1952, Leon Fraser captain A. C. Penzenhagen was accused by property owners living along the St. Clair River of speeding that caused damage-causing waves on shore. Penzenhagen denied the accusations, suggesting the property damage was caused by ice over the winter and early spring.

In the 1960s and 1970s, the ship also hauled grain in addition to ore. In 1982, U.S. Steel's Great Lakes Fleet put the Leon Fraser into storage in Lorain, Ohio.

Cement carrier (SS Alpena)

Shortening and conversion 
In October 1989, the Leon Fraser was purchased by Fraser Shipyards in Superior, Wisconsin, which planned to shorten the ship and convert it into a cement carrier. The following year, she was purchased by New Management Enterprises and renamed the Alpena. According to Alpena third mate Erik Sawyer, shortening the ship would make her stronger by reducing the amount her hull could bend. It also would allow the ship to service ports that were formerly too small for her original size.

The shipyards shortened the Leon Fraser by removing her  midsection in a dry dock, then flooded the dry dock to float the two ends of the ship, and ultimately welded the ends of the ship back together. In addition to being shortened, the ship was also converted into a self-unloading cement carrier. After being shortened, she measures  in length, and weighs .

In service 

As of 1991, New Management Enterprises used her to transport cement between Alpena, Michigan, and other Great Lakes cement ports, including Chicago; Duluth, Minnesota; Green Bay, Wisconsin; Milwaukee; Superior, Wisconsin; and Waukegan, Illinois. That year she was operated by a crew of 28.

In 1999, the Alpena was the largest of Inland Lakes Management's fleet, which also included the Paul H. Townsend, the JAW Iglehart, and the tugboat-barge Integrity. At that time, the Alpena was making about 70 trips per year, typically on Lake Michigan and Lake Superior, during her season from mid-March to late January. She spent the winter at her port of registry, Cleveland.

By 2015, she was the oldest active steamship on the Great Lakes. In 2014, the last active Canadian steamship on the Great Lakes, the Algoma Montrealais, was scrapped, while in the winter of 2015–16 two American steamships (the Herbert C. Jackson and the John G. Munson) were converted to diesel power.

In December 2015, she was damaged by a fire while in the Fincantieri Bay Shipbuilding (FBS) dry dock in Sturgeon Bay, Wisconsin, for a standard five-year inspection. The fire was estimated to have caused $3 million of damage to the ship. The Alpena was repaired after the fire and returned to service in 2016.

As of 2021, the ship is owned by Andrie Transportation Group (of Muskegon, Michigan) and Inland Lakes Management.

At the end of the 2021 season, the Alpena returned to the dry dock at FBS in Sturgeon Bay for her mandatory five-year inspection. She shared the dry dock with the SS Badger, which was simultaneously undergoing her five-year inspection. While in the dry dock, the Alpena also received a new coat of paint. She left Sturgeon Bay on January 28, 2022.

See also

References 

Great Lakes freighters
Merchant ships of the United States
1942 ships
Ships built in Ecorse, Michigan